Imlay is an unincorporated town in Pershing County, Nevada, United States. It has an elementary school, a general store, a post office, and a trading post. As of the 2010 census the population was 171.

It is a nearly abandoned railroad town, named for a nearby mine or for the civil engineer who surveyed the town circa 1907. Its most notable feature is a series of strange buildings called Thunder Mountain Monument. These structures were built as a monument to Native American culture by a World War II veteran who called himself Thunder.

Michael Feldman's Whad'Ya Know? public radio show featured Imlay as the "Town of the Week" on its December 5, 2009, show. They mentioned Thunder Mountain Monument as one of the premier draws to the area.

Geography
Imlay is located in northern Pershing County, Nevada, along Interstate 80, with access from Exit 145. The Humboldt River flows past  to the north, near its inlet into Rye Patch Reservoir.

Demographics

References

Census-designated places in Pershing County, Nevada
Census-designated places in Nevada
Unincorporated towns in Nevada